Vetranio (died c. 356) was a Roman soldier, statesman and co-Emperor, a native of the province of Moesia (in modern Serbia).

Life and career

Early life 
Vetranio was born in the Roman province of Moesia to low-born parents, sometime in the late 3rd century. His early professions are unknown, but it is evident that very early in his youth he joined the army.
Though unlettered, Vetranio rose rapidly through the ranks from obscurity, being ultimately elevated by Constans to the governor of Illyria. He held this command for a very long period of time, and by the time of Constans' death (January 350) was considered an officer of both popularity and experience. After the murder of Constans by the usurper Magnentius, Constantina, Constans' sister and the daughter of Constantine the Great asked the aged Vetranio to assume the purple, which he did on 1 March. She most likely thought Vetranio could protect her family and herself against the usurper, and merely hoped to secure his fidelity, though Edward Gibbon credits her notoriously unscrupulous ambition for the scheme, suggesting interested motives on her part. In any case, Constantius II was then embroiled in a dangerous struggle with Shapur II, the king of the Sasanian Empire. Constantina may have doubted her brother's resolution.

Emperor 

Vetranio accepted the purple, and coins were minted in his name, showing the title of Augustus (full emperor), rather than Caesar, and the coins indicated that he expected to rule for five years, and hoped for ten. Constantius was not initially disinclined to accept the election of the Illyrian emperor, but the latter soon joined himself to the cause of Magnentius, and the two presented a united front against Constantius II in their embassy to his court at Heraclea in Thrace, where he had arrived from the Persian war. They offered him the senior title in the Empire, and Magnentius proposed to wed his daughter to Constantius, himself to marry Constantia the emperor's sister. But they required that the emperor lay down his arms and ratify their claims to the western provinces. Constantius, supposedly inspired by his father Constantine in a nocturnal vision, indignantly declined the offer.
 
Constantius, however, designed to conceal his enmity to Vetranio, and, while disdaining negotiation with Magnentius, speciously conceded his (Vetranio's) claims and title, wishing to reconcile him to his cause for the war against Magnentius. According to Philostorgius, Constantius sent Vetranio a diadem, thus recognizing his status as emperor. The vacillating Illyrian accepted the rapprochement, again uniting himself to the house of Constantine. Constantius met with Vetranio either at Naissus, or Sirmium, or at Serdica, to unite their strength for the war.

Sardica 
Constantius presently threw off the disguise. On 25 December, in a scene contrived by officers in Vetranio's army well-disposed towards Constantius, the two emperors mounted a tribunal to address the assembled legions; Constantius succeeded, by means of a strong speech, in which he invoked the glories of the house of Constantine I, to have the Illyrian legions acclaim him sole emperor. Vetranio threw himself on the ground and begged Constantius' clemency. The emperor gently raised the aged general by the hand, honoring him with the name of father, and gave him instant pardon.

Later life and death 
Later he was dismissed in peace. Though dismissed from his command, he was allowed to live the remainder of his years as a private citizen on a state pension in Prusa ad Olympum, Bithynia. He lived a further six years, dying in simple happiness. He is said to have recommended to Constantius as his friend, during his happy retirement in Brusa, that peace could only be obtained in a private station.

References

External links 

Vetranio's profile in the Prosopography of the Later Roman Empire
, "Vetranio (350 A.D.)", in DIR (1996).
 Vetranio coinage
 Most complete internet database of known coin types of Vetranio

350s deaths
Year of birth unknown
Year of death uncertain
4th-century Roman emperors

4th-century Roman usurpers
Monarchs who abdicated